DYCF (88.5 FM), broadcasting as Radyo Todo 88.5 aka FM1 Radyo Todo 88.5, is a radio station owned and operated by Todo Media, Inc. The station's studio and transmitter are located along Manggayad Main Rd., Brgy. Manocmanoc, Malay, Aklan.

Todo Media Stations

References

Radio stations in Boracay
Radio stations established in 2013